is a private university in Settsu, Osaka, Japan. It is not the same as Osaka University, which is a National University and also hosts a Faculty of Human Sciences. The predecessor of the school was founded in June 1933, and it was chartered as a university in 2001.

External links
 Official website

Settsu, Osaka
Educational institutions established in 1933
Private universities and colleges in Japan
Universities and colleges in Osaka Prefecture
1933 establishments in Japan